Ambarlı A power plant or Istanbul Natural Gas Combined Cycle A power plant is a gas-fired power station in İstanbul Province north-western Turkey.

References

External links 

 

Natural gas-fired power stations in Turkey